CR7 Motorsports (also sometimes known as Grant County Mulch Racing) is an American professional stock car racing team that currently competes in the NASCAR Craftsman Truck Series, fielding the No. 9 Chevrolet Silverado for Colby Howard and the No. 97 part-time for Codie Rohrbaugh. As well as in the ARCA Menards Series with the No. 97 Chevrolet part-time for Jason Kitzmiller. The team has also competed in the ARCA Menards Series East in the past.

The team is not named after Association football/soccer player Cristiano Ronaldo.

History

ARCA Menards Series East
Rohrbaugh's family team made their first NASCAR starts in 2014 in what was then the K&N Pro Series East while also competing full-time in the X-1R Pro Cup Series that year. With his grandfather Larry Berg as the listed owner, the team fielded the No. 05 Toyota in three races: Five Flags, New Hampshire, and Dover. Their best finish was in their debut at Five Flags, where Rohrbaugh finished 13th.

They returned for another part-time schedule in 2015, switching numbers from the No. 05 to the No. 7 and manufacturers from Toyota to Chevrolet. The team ran New Hampshire and Dover again, and also for the first time attempted New Smyrna, Bristol, and Richmond. The other race they entered that year was the East Series’ first and to-date only race at Motordrome Speedway, where Rohrbaugh and his team earned their first top-10 with a 9th place finish.

The team attempted five East Series races the following year. They attempted mostly the same schedule, but with Motordrome and Richmond off the schedule for 2016, they attempted the new race at Mobile instead. Rohrbaugh crashed out in two of his five starts and finished in the top-20 (two 19ths and a 13th) in his remaining races.

ARCA Menards Series
In addition to their K&N East races in 2016, Rohrbaugh's team made their ARCA debut that year, running the last two races of the year at Kentucky and Kansas. The same as how he did in his first East Series start, Rohrbaugh finished 13th in his ARCA Series debut. However, Rohrbaugh did not finish the race at Kansas due to electrical issues and ended up 32nd.

For 2017, Rohrbaugh and his No. 7 team attempted an expanded schedule of eight races in ARCA after dropping their K&N program. The team ran Chevrolets in all races, except for Daytona and Talladega that they ran Dodges. Rohrbaugh finished every race no worse than 16th except for when he crashed out at Chicago, finishing 29th.  His best finishes were a pair of 8th-place runs at Michigan and Kansas.

The team started out the 2018 season now driving a Chevrolet SS but crashed at Daytona and rebuilt the same car in time to attempt Talladega.

At the ARCA Daytona test in January 2019, Rohrbaugh announced he would compete in all the speedway races that year. However, Rohrbaugh eventually decided to focus on the Truck Series team, and they cut back their ARCA schedule for the rest of the 2019 season. Eric Caudell bought the team's owner points and switched his team's car number from the No. 2 to the No. 7, which Rohrbaugh's team had been running.

For 2020, the team returned to ARCA, entering a car in the series' testing at January in January with newcomer Jason Kitzmiller driving the No. 97 (since Caudell was continuing to use the No. 7). The team then filed an entry for the race there in February. The team has yet to announce whether they will attempt more races throughout the year after Daytona.

NASCAR Craftsman Truck Series

Rohrbaugh did qualify for the race in his and the team's first Truck Series attempt, at Bristol in 2018. As Korbin Forrister's team was already using the No. 7, they picked the No. 9 to use for their Truck Series team. They finished with a top-20 in their first race (16th) in No. 9 Chevrolet Silverado. Returning for the race at Texas in November, now driving a Ford truck, Rohrbaugh was able to make the race again, and he impressively picked up another top-20, finishing 17th. The team did announce they would be attempting Homestead, but they changed their mind to focus on preparing for the ARCA season-opener at Daytona in 2019.

Returning in 2019, CR7M attempted twelve races, about half of the season, and all with Rohrbaugh as the driver. The team used Silverados in all races they attempted. Rohrbaugh qualified for nine of twelve races. His DNQs came at Daytona, Martinsville in March, and Bristol. He crashed in each of the first three races he did qualify for, which were at both Texas races (in March and June) and Charlotte. His other DNF that year came when he was involved in the big one at Talladega. Despite not qualifying for some of his races and not finishing in others, he scored a top-10 finish in the second Martinsville race in October. Also in 2019, the team worked with three different crew chiefs. They started the year with Michael Shelton before he left to crew chief the No. 46 Kyle Busch Motorsports team. Their general manager and ARCA team crew chief Mark Huff worked with the truck team for the first Martinsville race. They then picked up Doug George, who came over after starting the season with the Niece Motorsports No. 44 team.
Rohrbaugh returned and ran 17 races in 2020. The season started with him finishing third in the NextEra Energy 250. Other than that, Rohrbaugh posted 5 top 20 finishes, including a 5th-place finish at Talladega Superspeedway and a 6th-place finish at Richmond Raceway. In 2021, Rohrbaugh got another top-10 in the season opener NextEra Energy 250, finishing 8th. Grant Enfinger drove the No. 9 at Las Vegas Motor Speedway, finishing 7th. At the end of the year Colby Howard would make 3 starts for the team. In 2022, Blaine Perkins would drive the No. 9 truck full-time.

Truck No. 9 results

References

External links
 

NASCAR teams
ARCA Menards Series teams